Catherine Woodville (also spelled Wydville, Wydeville, or Widvile) (c. 1458 – 18 May 1497) was the Duchess of Buckingham and a medieval English noblewoman.

Early life
Catherine was the daughter of Richard Woodville, 1st Earl Rivers, and Jacquetta of Luxembourg. When her sister Elizabeth married Edward IV of England, the King elevated and promoted many members of the Woodville family. Elizabeth Woodville's household records for 1466/67 indicate that Catherine was being raised in the queen's household.

First marriage
Sometime before the coronation of Elizabeth in May 1465, Catherine was married to Henry Stafford, 2nd Duke of Buckingham; both were still children. A contemporary description of Elizabeth Woodville's coronation relates that Catherine and her husband were carried on squires' shoulders due to their youth. According to Dominic Mancini, Buckingham resented his marriage to a woman of inferior birth. However, the couple had four children:  
 Edward Stafford, 3rd Duke of Buckingham (3 February 1478 – 17 May 1521)
 Elizabeth Stafford, Countess of Sussex (c. 1479 – 11 May 1532)
 Henry Stafford, 1st Earl of Wiltshire (c. 1479 – 6 April 1523)
 Anne Stafford, Countess of Huntingdon (c. 1483–1544)

In 1483, Buckingham first allied himself to the Duke of Gloucester, helping him succeed to the throne as King Richard III, and then to Henry Tudor, leading an unsuccessful rebellion in his name. Buckingham was executed for treason on 2 November 1483.

Second marriage
After Richard III was defeated by Henry Tudor at the Battle of Bosworth in 1485, Catherine married the new king's uncle Jasper Tudor on 7 November 1485.

Third marriage

After Jasper's death in December 1495, Catherine married -- not later than 24 February 1496 -- Sir Richard Wingfield, who outlived her.

Depiction in fiction
Catherine is the main protagonist in Susan Higginbotham's 2010 historical novel The Stolen Crown. She is briefly mentioned in Philippa Gregory's historical novels The White Queen (2009), The Red Queen (2010), and The White Princess (2013).

Notes

References

Sources
 (chart 806)
 
 
 
 

1458 births
1497 deaths
Catherine
Daughters of British earls
Women of the Tudor period
Buckingham
15th-century English nobility
15th-century English women
Catherine
Duchesses of Bedford
Wives of knights